Season thirty-three of the television program American Experience aired on the PBS network in the United States on January 11, 2021 and concluded on September 28, 2021. The season contained eight new episodes and began with the film The Codebreaker.

Episodes

References

2021 American television seasons
American Experience